Samuel Wagan Watson is a contemporary Indigenous Australian poet.

Early life
Samuel Wagan Watson was born in Brisbane and is of Munanjali and Germanic descent. His father is the novelist and political activist, Sam Watson. Watson grew up in Caboolture West and completed his secondary studies at Morayfield State High School, with his sister Nicole, a lawyer. In his youth, Watson enjoyed fishing and diving off the end of a jetty in Brisbane with friends.

Career
Watson originally was known as an author of short stories, however changed focus to poetry after many rejections from companies. Watson's shift was inspired by one such company noting that his writing contained good poetic elements. Watson's first poems were in sonnet form, in contrast to the free verse of his current style. The themes of his poetry range from observations of everyday experience, to the effects of colonisation in a vividly direct, almost tactile, language.

In the late 1990s, Watson was invited to participate in a Brisbane City Council project to raise awareness of the Boondall Wetlands, alongside fellow poets Brett Dionysius and Liz Hall-Downs. The project was set up to bring together historians, poets, photographers, environmentalists and designers and show the cultural history of the Wetlands, both the local indigenous history and the experiences of European settlers.  In 2000 an audio CD was produced of the three poets' work, called Blackfellas Whitefellas Wetlands.  The very different voices and focus of the poets worked together to create a sense or place and of history.

His 2004 poetry collection Smoke Encrypted Whispers has been set to music by 23 Brisbane-based composers, who each wrote a two-minute piece to respond to a particular poem.  The project was commissioned by the clarinetist Paul Dean, who conducted a recording of the work featuring soprano Margaret Schindler and the Southern Cross Soloists, with Ron Haddrick narrating.

The Japanese Aeronautical Exploration Agency has commissioned Watson to write some haiku to keep Japanese astronauts amused on the International Space Station.

Watson is currently touring Australia and delivering poetry courses in various schools, such as Brisbane Grammar School, as a writer in residence.

Influences
Watson recognises the influence of his parents in his work, and also cited Nick Cave, Tom Waits, Jack Kerouac, Charles Bukowski and Robert Adamson as influences.

Awards and nominations
  1999 — Queensland Premier's Literary Awards, David Unaipon Award for an Emerging Indigenous Writers for Of Muse, Meandering and Midnight
  2005 — New South Wales Premier's Literary Awards, Kenneth Slessor Prize for Poetry Book of the Year for Smoke Encrypted Whispers
2018 — Patrick White Literary Award

Samuel Watson has also received a Highly Commended in both the Anne Elder Awards and the 2000 Award for Outstanding Contributions to Australian Culture.

Bibliography

Books
 Of Muse, Meandering and Midnight. (UQP, 1999) 
 Itinerant Blues. (UQP, 2002)  reviewed
 Hotel Bone (Vagabone Press, 2001)
 Smoke Encrypted Whispers. (UQP, 2004) 
 Three legged dogs, and other poems. (Picaro Press, 2005) OCLC: 69249268

Articles and other publications

Other media

Notes

External links
Review of Smoke at Australian Humanities Review
 Messagestick Aboriginal and Torres Strait Islander Online  Review 4 July 2007
 ABC Queensland review by radio presenters Steve Austin & Hilary Beaton
 Brisbane Stories 1996-2005 Artists in Boondall Wetlands - 2002
 Gehrmann, S. (2016, 6 October). Interview of Watson S W. Brisbane Grammar School interview.

1972 births
Australian poets
Indigenous Australian writers
Living people
People from Brisbane
Bundjalung people